David McEwan may refer to:

 David McEwan (footballer) (born 1982), Scottish footballer
 David McEwan (producer) (born 1972), Australian/British music producer and musician